Faustus Cornelius Sulla may refer to:

 Faustus Cornelius Sulla (quaestor 54 BC)
 Faustus Cornelius Sulla (consul 31)
 Faustus Cornelius Sulla Felix, son of the previous, consul in 52 AD.